This article contains a list of Wikipedia articles about politicians in countries outside of Indian subcontinent who are of Indian origin.

Australia

Federal parliament
 Christabel Chamarette – Greens Senator for Western Australia
 Zaneta Mascarenhas – Labor MP for Swan
 Lisa Singh – Labor Senator for Tasmania
 Dave Sharma – Liberal MP for Wentworth

State and territory parliaments
 June D'Rozario – Northern Territory Labor MLA
 Deepak-Raj Gupta – Australian Capital Territory Labor MLA
 Jags Krishnan – Western Australia Labor MLA
 Kevin Michel – Western Australia Labor MLA
 Daniel Mookhey – New South Wales Labor MLC
 Lauren Moss – Northern Territory Labor MLA
 Yaz Mubarakai – Western Australia Labor MLA
 Gurmesh Singh – New South Wales National MP
 Kaushaliya Vaghela – Victoria Labor MLC
 Anne Warner – Queensland Labor MLA

Canada
 Bharat Agnihotri – Alberta Liberal MLA
 Hardial Bains – founder and leader of the Marxist–Leninist Party of Canada, 1970–1997
 Harry Bains – British Columbia New Democratic MLA
 Navdeep Bains – Liberal Member of Parliament
 Bas Balkissoon
 Gulzar Singh Cheema – British Columbia and Manitoba MLA
 Raj Chouhan – British Columbia NDP MLA
 Herb Dhaliwal – Liberal MP; first Indo-Canadian cabinet minister
 Ruby Dhalla – Liberal MP
 Vic Dhillon – Ontario Liberal Ontario MPP
 Ujjal Dosanjh – former Premier of British Columbia; first Indo-Canadian premier; former federal Minister of Health
 Parm Gill – Conservative Member of Parliament for Brampton—Springdale
 Raminder Gill – former Ontario Progressive Conservative MPP and federal Conservative candidate
 Baljit Gosal – MP and Minister of State for Sports
 Gurmant Grewal – former Conservative MP, half (with Nina, listed below) of the first married couple to serve as MPs in the same session of Parliament
 Nina Grewal – Conservative MP, half (with Gurmant) of the first married couple to serve as MPs in the same session of Parliament
 Dave Hayer – former British Columbia BC Liberal MLA for Surrey Tynehead
 Bidhu Jha – Manitoba NDP MLA
 Kamal Khera – Liberal Member of Parliament (MP) for Brampton West and the Parliamentary Secretary to the Minister of National Revenue
 Kuldip Singh Kular – Ontario Liberal MPP
 Harry Lali – BC NDP MLA
 Gurbax Singh Malhi – Liberal MP
 Harinder Malhi – Liberal MP
 Rob Nijjar – former BC Liberal MLA
 Deepak Obhrai – Alberta Conservative Party MP
 Raj Pannu – former leader of the Alberta New Democrats; first Indo-Canadian leader of a political party
 Harjit Singh Sajjan – Member of Parliament representing the riding of Vancouver South and Minister of National Defense
 Randeep Sarai – Member of Parliament for the federal electoral district Surrey Centre
 Shiraz Shariff – Alberta Progressive Conservative MLA
 Moe Sihota – former British Columbia NDP MLA and television host
 Jaggi Singh – anti-globalization activist
 Jagmeet Singh – former NDP MLA for Bramlea- Malton (Ontario); elected leader of the Federal New Democratic Party (NDP); first person of Indian descent to be elected leader of a prominent party at the national level in North America
 Harinder Takhar – Ontario Liberal MPP and Minister of Transportation
 Tim Uppal – Conservative Member of Parliament (MP) for Edmonton Mill Woods
 Murad Velshi – former Ontario Liberal MPP
 Prasad Panda – UCP MLA for Calgary, Alberta
 Judi Tyabji,a Indian(Bengali)-Canadian politician  & was the youngest elected Member of the Legislative Assembly of British Columbia from Progressive Democratic Alliance party
Chandrakanth "Chandra" Arya, MP from Napean

Fiji
 Mahendra Chaudhry – first Indo-Fijian Prime Minister (1999–2000)
 Ahmed Ali (1938–2005) – several times a cabinet minister
 George Shiu Raj – Cabinet Minister
 Anand Singh – Fiji Labour Party Senator and former Attorney-General
 Vijay R. Singh – former Cabinet Minister
 Sidiq Koya – Leader of the Opposition National Federation Party
 Dorsami Naidu – Leader of the National Federation Party
 A. D. Patel (1905–1969)- founder of the National Federation Party
 Pramod Rae – General Secretary of the National Federation Party
 Jai Ram Reddy – Leader of the National Federation Party (1977–1987; 1992–1999); judge
 Prem Singh – former NFP leader
 Raman Pratap Singh – National Federation Party leader
 Amjad Ali – FLP politician
 Narendra Arjun – former NFP parliamentarian
 Anand Babla – FLP politician
 Pratap Chand – FLP politician
 Gaffar Ahmed – FLP politician
 Gunasagaran Gounder – FLP politician
 Hafiz Khan – businessman and Senator
 James Shri Krishna – FLP politician
 Prince Gopal Lakshman – FLP politician
 Surendra Lal – FLP politician
 Sanjeet Chand Maharaj – FLP politician
 Perumal Mupnar – FLP Member of Parliament
 Shivlal Nagindas – Labasa businessman and former Senator
 Damodran Nair – FLP Member of Parliament
 Gyani Nand – FLP politician
 Ragho Nand – FLP politician
 Udit Narayan – FLP politician
 Krishna Prasad – FLP Member of Parliament
 Ram Sharan – FLP politician
 Gyan Singh – FLP Member of Parliament
 Pravin Singh – FLP Member of Parliament
 Satendra Singh – FLP politician
 Lekh Ram Vayeshnoi – Fiji Labour Party parliamentarian

Germany
 Ashok-Alexander Sridharan – Mayor of Bonn

Guyana
 Dale Bisnauth
 Ronald Gajraj
 Cheddi Jagan – 4th President of Guyana (1992-1997)
 Bharrat Jagdeo – 7th Prime Minister (1999) and 7th President (1999-2011)
 Samuel Insanally
 Joey Jagan
 Edward Luckhoo
 Lionel Luckhoo – politician, diplomat, and lawyer
 Donald Ramotar – 8th President (2011-2015)
 Moses Nagamootoo – 8th Prime Minister of Guyana (2015-2020)
 Irfaan Ali – 10th President (2020–present)
 Peter Ramsaroop
 Shridath Ramphal – Commonwealth Secretary General (1975-1990)
 Rupert Roopnaraine

Ireland
 Leo Varadkar – Taoiseach (2017–2020; 2022–present)

Jamaica
 Kamala-Jean Gopie

Japan
 Yogendra Puranik

Kenya
 Sunjeev Kour Birdi – Member of Parliament
 Alibhai Mulla Jeevanjee – merchant, politician and philanthropist
 Pio Gama Pinto – journalist, politician and freedom fighter
 Fitz Remedios Santana de Souza

Malaysia

 Tun Mahathir Mohamed – Prime Minister of Malaysia (1981-2003, 2018-2020)
 V. David – politician
 K. L. Devaser – fourth president of the Malaysian Indian Congress
 P. Kamalanathan – Member of Parliament Hulu Selangor and Deputy Minister, Ministry of Education; Central Working Committee Member of the Malaysian Indian Congress; founding member of PUTERA MIC
 Datuk M. Kayveas – president of PPP and deputy minister
 Devaki Krishnan – first Malaysian Indian woman to become a municipal councillor
 Tan Sri Devaki Krishnan – former politician
 Tan Sri V. Manickavasagam – sixth president of the Malaysian Indian Congress and former Minister of Communication
 M. Manoharan – former member of the Selangor State Legislative Assembly; known for his involvement with HINDRAF
 K. S. Nijhar – Member of Parliament
 Datuk G. Palanivel – Deputy Minister of Women and Family Development and deputy president of Malaysian Indian Congress
 Tan Sri M. G. Pandithan – founding President of the Indian Progressive Front (IPF)
 K. Parthiban – state assemblyman for Ijok (2007–2008)
 Datuk K. Pathmanaban – politician and former Deputy Minister of Labour and  founder of Melaka Manipal Medical College
 Sivarasa Rasiah – human rights lawyer and vice-president of the opposition Parti Keadilan Rakyat (People's Justice Party)
 Tun V. T. Sambanthan – one of the founding fathers of independent Malaya and Founder of National Land Finance Co-op.(NLFCS).
 D. R. Seenivasagam – founder of PPP and politician
 Kula Segaran – MP for Ipoh Barat and DAP National Vice Chairman
 Karpal Singh – chairman of opposition Democratic Action Party and member of parliament
 Datuk K. Sivalingam – former member of the state executive council of Selangor
 John Thivy – freedom fighter and founding president of the Malayan Indian Congress
 E. E. C. Thuraisingham – politician of pre-Independence Malaysia
 Tan Sri G. Vadiveloo – former Speaker of the Senate
 Datuk Seri Samy Vellu – Works Minister in the Malaysian cabinet and president of the Malaysian Indian Congress

Mauritius
 Sookdeo Bissoondoyal – politician and one of the three founding fathers of independent Mauritius
 Dayendranath Burrenchobay – Governor-General of Mauritius (1978-1983)
 Jaya Krishna Cuttaree – diplomat
 Madun Dulloo – diplomat
 Anerood Jugnauth – Prime Minister (2000-2003, 2014-2017) and President of Mauritius (2003-2012)
 Pravind Jugnauth – Prime Minister of Mauritius (2017–present)
 Dev Manraj – former Financial Secretary
 Abdool Razack Mohamed – one of the three founding fathers of independent Mauritius
 Kailash Purryag – President (2012-2015)
 Navin Ramgoolam – Prime Minister (1995-2000, 2005-2014)
 Seewoosagur Ramgoolam – Prime Minister (1968-1982) and one of the three founding fathers of independent Mauritius
 Veerasamy Ringadoo – President (1992)
 Cassam Uteem – President (2002)
 Ameenah Gurib-Fakim – President (2015-2018)
 Prithvirajsing Roopun – President (2019–present)

Netherlands
 Tanja Jadnanansing – Labour Party politician

New Zealand
 Kanwaljit Singh Bakshi – Member of Parliament
 Parmjeet Parmar – Member of Parliament
 Anand Satyanand – first Governor-General of New Zealand of Asian descent (2006-2011)
 Priyanca Radhakrishnan – Member of Parliament

Papua New Guinea
 Sasindran Muthuvel – Governor of West New Britain

Philippines
 Ramon Bagatsing - former Congressman and Mayor of Manila (1972-1986)

Portugal
 António Costa – Prime Minister of Portugal (2015–present)
 Alfredo Nobre da Costa- Prime Minister (1978)
 Narana Coissoró- Member of Parliament
 João Leão- Finance Minister (2020-2022)
 Alfredo Bruto da Costa- Minister of Health and Welfare (1979-1980)

Singapore
 Vivian Balakrishnan – Minister of Community Development, Youth and Sports; former CEO of Singapore General Hospital
 S. Dhanabalan – Chairman of Temasek Holdings and DBS Bank, former Minister of National Development, Trade and Industry and Foreign Affairs; tipped by Singapore's first Prime Minister Lee Kuan Yew as one of the four men he considered as a possible successor
 James Gomez – senior leader in the main opposition party (the Workers Party); founder of Think Centre, a political NGO
 S. Iswaran – Minister for Communications and Information, former Managing Director of Temasek Holdings
 S. Jayakumar – Deputy Prime Minister, Minister for Law and co-ordinating Minister for Security; former Foreign Minister and ambassador to the United Nations, and Dean of the Law School in Singapore
 J. B. Jeyaretnam – former Leader of the Opposition; former MP; first person to break the PAP monopoly in parliament in 1984; former magistrate
 Devan Nair – third President of Singapore (1981–1985), father of the modern trades union movement in Singapore
 Hri Kumar Nair – former MP
 S. R. Nathan – 6th President of Singapore (1999-2011)
 Murali Pillai – MP
 Indranee Rajah – Minister in Prime minister's Office, Senior Counsel of Supreme Court of Singapore
 S. Rajaratnam – former Senior Minister, Deputy Prime Minister and Minister for Foreign Affairs, Labour and Culture; co-founder of the Peoples Action Party and Association of South East Asian Nations; author of the Singapore Pledge; one of the pioneer leaders of modern Singapore
 Balaji Sadasivan – Junior Minister
 K. Shanmugam – Minister for Home Affairs, former Senior Counsel of Supreme Court of Singapore
 Tharman Shanmugaratnam – Minister of Education and former head of Singapore's de facto central bank
 Pritam Singh – Leader of the Opposition and MP
 Halimah Yacob – 8th President (2017–present)

Seychelles
 Wavel Ramkalawan – President of Seychelles (2020–present)
 Satya Naidu- first Hindu member of Seychelles National Assembly.

South Africa
 Yusuf Dadoo – doctor and politician
 Frene Ginwala – former speaker of the National Assembly
 Pregs Govender
 Ronnie Govender
 Ahmed Kathrada – political activist
 Jody Kollapen
 Mac Maharaj – political activist and former MP
 George Naicker
 Monty Naicker
 Amma Naidoo
 Indira Naidoo
 Naransamy Roy Naidoo
 Shanti Naidoo
 Thambi Naidoo
 Xavier Naidoo
 Billy Nair
 Dullah Omar – politician
 Aziz Pahad – political activist and former MP
 Essop Pahad – political activist and former MP
 Radhakrishna Padayachi – Deputy Minister for Communication
 Ebrahim Patel – Minister of Economy
 Enver Surty – Deputy Minister of Basic Education
 Thillaiaadi Valliammai

Spain
 Robert Masih Nahar, senator in the Spanish Senate

Suriname
 Ashwin Adhin – Vice President (2015-2020)
 Jagernath Lachmon – Speaker of the National Assembly of Suriname (1987-1996, 2000-2001)
 Marijke Djwalapersad – Speaker of the National Assembly (1996-2000)
 Fred Ramdat Misier – President of Suriname (1982–1988)
 Errol Alibux – Prime Minister of Suriname (1983-1984)
 Pretaap Radhakishun – Prime Minister (1986-1987)
 Chan Santokhi – President (2020–present)
 Ram Sardjoe – Speaker of the National Assembly (2001-2005) and Vice President (2005-2010)
 Ramsewak Shankar – President (1988–1990)

Switzerland

 Nik Gugger – adopted from Karnataka; first Indian-origin members of the Swiss parliament

Tanzania

 Hasnain Dewji
 Mohammed Dewji
 Wolfgang Dourado
 Parmukh Singh Hoogan
 Amir H. Jamal
 Ismail Jussa
 Al Noor Kassum
 Shanif Mansoor
 Hasnain Murji
 Mohamed Raza
 Muhammad Sanya
 Abdulkarim Shah
 Jitu Soni
 Haroun Suleiman
 Shaffin Sumar

Thailand
 Santi Thakral – former president of the Supreme Court of Thailand and former member of the Privy Council of Thailand

Trinidad and Tobago 
 Raziah Ahmed – President of the Senate (2015)
 Faris Al-Rawi  – Attorney General (2015-2022)
Linda Baboolal –  President of the Senate (2002-2007)
 Rudranath Capildeo
 Simbhoonath Capildeo
 Carol Cuffy-Dowlat
 Winston Dookeran
 George F. Fitzpatrick
 Hardeo Hardath – former MP
 Noor Hassanali – President (1987-1997)
 Christine Kangaloo – President of the Senate (2015)
 Franklin Khan
 Fuad Khan
 Dhanayshar Mahabir
 Devant Maharaj
 Ramesh Maharaj
 Kenneth Ramchand
 Bhadase Maraj
 Ralph Maraj
 Wade Mark
 Roodal Moonilal
 Basdeo Panday – Trade Union leader and Prime Minister (1995-2001)
 Kamla Persad-Bissessar – Prime Minister (2010-2015)
 Mohammed Faisal Rahman
 Surujrattan Rambachan
 Anand Ramlogan
 Adrian Cola Rienzi (Krishna Deonarine Tiwari)
 Raffique Shah – Leader of the Opposition
 Cindy Devika Sharma
 Ashford Sinanan

United Kingdom

 Baron Bhattacharyya – Member of the House of Lords
 Mancherjee Bhownagree – Conservative MP; second Indian MP in the House of Commons
 Harpal Brar - Chairman of the Communist Party of Great Britain (Marxist-Leninist)
 Nirj Deva – Conservative MEP
 Parmjit Dhanda – Labour MP
 Rajani Palme Dutt - General Secretary of the Communist Party of Great Britain
 Piara Khabra – Labour MP 
 Ashok Kumar – Labour MP
 Claude Moraes – Labour MEP
 Dadabhai Naoroji – Liberal MP; first Indian MP in the House of Commons
 Priti Patel – Conservative MP; Home Secretary 
 Shapurji Saklatvala – Communist MP
 Virendra Sharma – Labour MP and councillor in Ealing
 Alok Sharma – Conservative MP and Secretary of State for Business, Energy and Industrial Strategy
 Marsha Singh – Labour MP
 Parmjit Singh Gill – Liberal Democrat MP
 Satyendra Prasanna Sinha, 1st Baron Sinha – first Indian member of the House of Lords
 Rishi Sunak – Prime Minister and Leader of the Conservative Party (2022–present)
 Shailesh Vara – Conservative MP
 Keith Vaz – Labour MP; longest-serving British Asian MP; former Minister for Europe and Privy Council member

United States
 Nimi McConigley – Republican member of the Wyoming House of Representatives was the first Indian born person and the first Indian American women to serve in any State legislature.
 Harry Anand – mayor of Laurel Hollow, New York; first Indian-American mayor in New York
 Neel Kashkari – Republican politician and former Gubernatorial candidate in California
 Niraj J. Antani – Republican member of Ohio House of Representatives from Ohio's 42nd District; first Indian American Republican elected to the Ohio House
 Sam Arora – former Democratic member of the Maryland House of Delegates
 Kumar P. Barve – Democratic member (and former Majority Leader) of the Maryland House of Delegates from Maryland's 17th Legislative District in Montgomery County; first Indian American to be elected to any state legislature
 Ami Bera – Democratic member of the U.S. House of Representatives from California's 7th congressional district – former Chief Medical Officer for Sacramento County
 Raj Peter Bhakta – entrepreneur, former The Apprentice contestant, and 2006 Republican U.S. House nominee in Pennsylvania's 13th congressional district
 Ravinder S. Bhalla – mayor of Hoboken, New Jersey, first Sikh mayor in NJ
 Satveer Chaudhary – former state senator and representative in Minnesota Senate and Minnesota House of Representatives
 Joy Cherian – first Asian and Indian American head of the EEOC
 Upendra Chivukula – Commissioner on the New Jersey Board of Public Utilities; former Democratic member and Deputy Speaker of the New Jersey General Assembly (first Indian-American elected to the NJ state legislature)
 Swati Dandekar – member of Iowa House of Representatives
 Bhagwan Dashairya – 2006 nominee for Governor of Michigan of the U.S. Taxpayers Party
 Manka Dhingra – Democratic member of the Washington State Senate from Washington's 45th legislative district
 Kashmir Gill – mayor of Yuba City, California; first Indian-American mayor in CA and first Sikh mayor in the US
 Vin Gopal – Democratic member of the New Jersey Senate from New Jersey's 11th Legislative District, which covers portions of Monmouth County; third Indian American elected to NJ state legislature and first Indian American NJ state senator; former Chairman of the Monmouth County Democratic Party
 Raj Goyle – former Democratic member of the Kansas House of Representatives from Kansas' 87th District; first Indian American elected official in that state
 Nikki Haley – former U.S. Ambassador to the United Nations and Governor of South Carolina; first Indian American to hold both offices and first female Governor of South Carolina
 Kamala Harris – 49th Vice President of the United States (first Indian American; first African American; and first female Vice President of the U.S.); former United States Senator from the State of California (first Indian American in the U.S. Senate and first African American senator from California); 32nd Attorney General of California (first Indian American attorney general in the U.S.) and the 27th District Attorney of San Francisco (first district attorney in the U.S. of Indian descent)
 Satish Hiremath – mayor of Oro Valley, Arizona; second Indian-American mayor in the US
 Pramila Jayapal – Democratic member of the U.S. House of Representatives from Washington's 7th Congressional District; former member of the Washington State Senate; first Indian American woman in both offices; founder of OneAmerica, a pro-immigration advocacy group
 Bobby Jindal – former Republican Governor of Louisiana (first Indian American governor in US history); former member of U.S. House of Representatives; former U.S. presidential candidate
 Ro Khanna – Democratic member of the U.S. House of Representatives from California's 17th Congressional District, former Deputy Assistant at the U.S. Department of Commerce
 Kris Kolluri – New Jersey Commissioner of Transportation
 Raja Krishnamoorthi – Democratic Member of the U.S. House of Representatives from Illinois' 8th Congressional District
 Aruna Miller – member of the Maryland House of Delegates (2010-2019), Lieutenant Governor of Maryland-Elect 2022
 Raj Mukherji – Majority Whip and Democratic member of the New Jersey General Assembly from New Jersey's 33rd Legislative District covering portions of Hudson County (second Indian American elected to NJ state legislature); former Deputy Mayor of Jersey City, NJ; former Commissioner and Chairman of the Jersey City Housing Authority (then the youngest to serve in that position)
 Ajit Pai – Chairman of the FCC and first Indian American to hold that position
 Rachel Paulose – first woman to become a U.S. Attorney in Minnesota; US Attorney for the District of Minnesota
 Kesha Ram – four-term member of the Vermont House of Representatives; candidate for Lieutenant Governor
 Harpreet Singh Sandhu – former Richmond City Council member
 Reshma Saujani – first Indian woman to run for Congress
 Amish Shah – member of the Arizona House of Representatives
 Balvir Singh – on the Burlington County Board of Chosen Freeholders, New Jersey; first Asian-American to win a countywide election in Burlington County; first Sikh-American to win a countywide election in NJ
 Dalip Singh Saund – first Indian-American congressman; Democratic member of the U.S. House of Representatives from California
 Kshama Sawant – Seattle City Council member; first socialist to win a city-wide election in Seattle since the radical progressive Anna Louise Strong was elected to the school board in 1916
 Kevin Thomas – first Indian-American member of the New York State Senate
 Seema Verma – first Indian-American female administrator of the U.S. Centers for Medicare and Medicaid Services
 Sara Gideon - Speaker of the Maine House of Representatives
 Suhas Subramanyam - first Indian-American elected to the Virginia General Assembly and former Obama Administration White House official

See also 
 List of heads of state and government of Indian origin
 List of foreign politicians of Chinese origin
 List of foreign politicians of Korean origin
 List of foreign politicians of Japanese origin
 List of foreign politicians of Vietnamese origin
 List of foreign politicians of Iranian origin

References 

+A
Lists of politicians